Blood Secret is a young adult novel by Kathryn Lasky.

Plot summary
Fourteen-year-old Jerry Luna refuses to speak after her mother's disappearance. Living at her great-great-aunt Constanza's house, she discovers a trunk and is transported into the lives of her Jewish ancestors living in Spain in the years before the Spanish Inquisition and in Spanish America.

References

See also

Time travel
Mutism
Jews of Spain

2004 American novels
American young adult novels
Novels about time travel
Novels set in Spain
HarperCollins books
Novels by Kathryn Lasky